The Herald Sun Player of the Year award is a media award for the Australian Football League (AFL) given by Melbourne newspaper the Herald Sun. It has been awarded annually since 1991 to the player who garners the most votes throughout the season, with a selected Herald Sun journalist awarding five votes to the player they judge to be the "best on ground", four votes to the second-best player, three votes to the third-best player, two votes to the fourth-best player and one vote for the fifth best player.

Winners

References

Australian Football League awards
Australian rules football awards
Most valuable player awards
Awards by newspapers
Awards established in 1991
1991 establishments in Australia